The development of the ministry of altar servers has a long history. In the early Church, many ministries were held by men and women. By the early Middle Ages, some of these ministries were formalized under the term "minor orders" and (along with the diaconate) used as steps to priestly ordination. One of the minor orders was the office of acolyte. Altar servers are a substitute for an instituted acolyte.  

In several Christian Churches, women have traditionally been excluded from approaching the altar during the liturgy. Thus The Service Book of the Orthodox Church (English translation by Isabel Florence Hapgood) states that "no woman may enter the Sanctuary at any time". In the Roman Rite of the Catholic Church, the former rule was: "women may not enter [the sanctuary] at all".

This did not exclude women, especially in convents of nuns, from entering the altar area at other times, for cleaning.

In Eastern Churches, women are further restricted by not being allowed inside the altar area and in some traditions even within the church building during their monthly periods.

Catholic Church

Former practice
Formerly, it was generally forbidden to have women serving near the altar within the sacred chancel (infra cancellos), that is, they were prohibited from entering the altar area behind the altar rails during the liturgy.  In convents of nuns, women did serve within the chancel.

In his encyclical Allatae sunt of 26 July 1775, Pope Benedict XIV renewed the prohibition, "Women should not dare to serve at the altar; they should be altogether refused this ministry", stated more than five centuries earlier by Pope Innocent IV in his letter Sub catholicae professione of 6 March 1254 to Odo of Tusculum on Greek rites. Pope Benedict XIV also stated that what he called the evil practice of women serving the priest at the celebration of Mass had been condemned also by Pope Gelasius I (492−496).

He used the following words:

The references to "the Greeks" pertains to the Orthodox practice of ordaining women as deaconesses. With the practice of private Masses (Mass by a priest and one other person, often offered for a deceased person), scandal was an additional reason not to have a woman or girl alone with a priest. However, it has been customary in convents of women for nuns to perform the ministry of acolyte without being formally ordained to that minor order. This practice was used when the Council of Trent developed the seminary system where men in minor orders would go away to schools for training to be a priest rather than study under a parish priest.

After the 1963 decision of the Second Vatican Council to reform the Catholic liturgy, trials were carried out, including that of allowing females to serve Mass in girls' schools and convents. However, the 1970 instruction Liturgicae instaurationes, in putting the council's decree into effect, withdrew permissions granted for experiments with the Mass while the reform was a work in progress and reaffirmed the traditional rules reserving service of the celebrant at the altar to males alone. This was repeated more briefly in the 1980 instruction Inaestimabile donum: "Women are not, however, permitted to act as altar servers." At the time of 1970 and 1980 instructions, the 1917 Code of Canon Law was still in force. It ruled: "A woman is not to be the server at Mass except when a man is unavailable and for a just reason and provided that she give the responses from a distance and in no way approach the altar." It was superseded by the 1983 Code of Canon Law, which did not maintain the prohibition.

Changes since Vatican II 

The 1983 Code of Canon Law, without distinguishing between male and female, said that "Lay persons can fulfill the function of lector in liturgical actions by temporary designation. All lay persons can also perform the functions of commentator or cantor, or other functions, according to the norm of law." Although that language did not explicitly authorize women to act as altar servers, many dioceses allowed females to act as altar servers.

The Holy See provided two clarifications in the 1990s. On 30 June 1992, the Pontifical Council for the Interpretation of Legislative Texts issued an authentic interpretation of that canon declaring that service at the altar is one of the "other functions" open to lay persons in general. On 15 March 1994, the Congregation for Divine Worship affirmed that both men and women may serve at the altar, that each bishop has the discretion to determine who may serve, and that "it will always be very appropriate to follow the noble tradition of having boys serve at the altar". 

On 10 January 2021, Pope Francis ordered a modification to canon law and related norms to state explicitly that all baptized persons can be admitted to the instituted ministries of lector and acolyte. Where women and girls already had the ability to exercise these functions "by temporary designation", he indicated their eligibility for these roles "on a stable basis".

Vatican and papal practice

Pope Benedict XVI had both male and female altar servers in Papal masses in London (2010), Berlin, and Freiburg (2011).

United States
In the United States the Diocese of Lincoln, Nebraska, was the only diocese that does not allow females to be altar servers, after the only other diocese ended its prohibition on female altar servers in 2006. The cathedral of the Diocese of Phoenix announced in August 2011 that it would become another of the Catholic churches in which women would not be allowed to serve at the altar.

In 2015, Cardinal Raymond Leo Burke, an American official of the Roman Curia, criticized the introduction of female altar servers as part of what he calls "radical feminism" and a unwelcome sign of the "feminization" of the Church. Burke says that it requires a "certain manly discipline to serve as an altar boy in service at the side of a priest, and most priests have their first deep experiences of the liturgy as altar boys. If we are not training young men as altar boys, giving them an experience of serving God in the liturgy, we should not be surprised that vocations have fallen dramatically."

Images of female servers

References

Catholic liturgy
Catholic theology and doctrine
Catholicism and women